Henrik Jacobsgaard (born March 9, 1952) is a former Danish handball player who competed in the 1976 Summer Olympics.

He played his club handball with SAGA (Samvirkets Atletik- og Gymnastik Afdeling). In 1976 he was part of the Denmark men's national handball team which finished eighth in the Olympic tournament. He played five matches and scored three goals.

References

1952 births
Living people
Danish male handball players
Olympic handball players of Denmark
Handball players at the 1976 Summer Olympics